Flemington railway station was situated on the boundary of Motherwell and Craigneuk (near Wishaw), Scotland from 1891 to 1965 on the Wishaw and Coltness Railway.

History 
The station opened on 2 March 1891 by the Caledonian Railway. The signal box, which opened with the station, was to the west of the westbound platform and the goods yard was to the south. To the north were sidings as well as Lanarkshire steel works. The station closed on 4 January 1965.

References

External links 

Disused railway stations in North Lanarkshire
Former Caledonian Railway stations
Beeching closures in Scotland
Railway stations in Great Britain opened in 1891
Railway stations in Great Britain closed in 1965
1891 establishments in Scotland
1965 disestablishments in Scotland
Buildings and structures in Motherwell